Historically, Storyville, New Orleans was the red light district of the city in Louisiana.

Storyville may also refer to:

Companies
 Storyville Coffee

Music
 Storyville Records, a Danish record label
 Storyville Records (George Wein's), a 1950s American jazz record label founded by George Wein
 Storyville (album), a 1991 Robbie Robertson album
 Storyville (magazine), British jazz magazine that ran from 1965 to 2003
 Storyville (band), an American blues-rock band

Entertainment
 Storyville (nightclub), a nightclub in Boston, Massachusetts

Movies and TV
 Storyville (film), a 1992 American film
 Storyville (TV series), a BBC documentary series
 Storyville Films, a U.S. film production company founded by Oren Jacoby